Anatoli Krikun (born 24 March 1948) is a retired Estonian professional basketball player, who competed for the Soviet Union.

Achievements

National Team
 Olympic Games:  1968
 World Championships:  1970
 European Championships:  1967

Club
 Estonian SSR Championship: 1969, 1970, 1973, 1980, 1982, 1983, 1986

References

External links
 Profile at databaseOlympics.com
 

1948 births
Living people
Basketball players at the 1968 Summer Olympics
Estonian basketball coaches
Estonian men's basketball players
FIBA EuroBasket-winning players
Korvpalli Meistriliiga players
Medalists at the 1968 Summer Olympics
Olympic basketball players of the Soviet Union
Olympic bronze medalists for the Soviet Union
Olympic medalists in basketball
Soviet men's basketball players
1970 FIBA World Championship players
Sportspeople from Tartu
Tartu Ülikool/Rock players
University of Tartu alumni